is a bay in the Inland Sea, Japan.  Administratively, the bay is divided between Hiroshima and Yamaguchi Prefectures.  The bay's shore is a Ria.  Its surface area is about 1,000 km², with a mean depth of 25 meters.

Municipalities
Kure, Hiroshima
Saka, Hiroshima
Kaita, Hiroshima
Fuchū, Hiroshima
Hiroshima
Hatsukaichi, Hiroshima
Ōtake, Hiroshima
Etajima, Hiroshima
Waki, Yamaguchi
Iwakuni, Yamaguchi

Major rivers
Kyōbashi River
Motoyasu River
Ōta River
Oze River
Tenma River

Major islands
Kanawajima
Tōgejima
Ninoshima
Enoshima
Etajima
Ōnasabijima (Ōnasamitō)
Ogurokamijima
Nomijima
West Nomijima
East Nomijima
Ōkurokamishima
Kurahashijima
Nasakejima
Atatajima
Inokojima
Itsukushima
Nagashima
Okinoshima
Kabutojima

Trivia
Jaco Pastorius once threw his "Bass of Doom" (Fender Jazz Bass) into the Hiroshima Bay.

References 

Hiroshima
Landforms of Hiroshima Prefecture
Landforms of Yamaguchi Prefecture